Aurlandsfjord is a fjord in Vestland county, Norway. The fjord flows through the municipalities of Aurland, Vik, and Lærdal. The village of Flåm sits at the innermost part of the Aurlandsfjord; other villages along the fjord are Aurlandsvangen and Undredal.

Large parts of the fjord are included in the Nærøyfjord section of the West Norwegian Fjords UNESCO world heritage site.

Gallery

References

External links

Fjords of Vestland
Sognefjord
Aurland
Lærdal
Vik